Duffus is a village and parish in Moray, Scotland.

The Duffus Village Inn, the local shop, Post Office and Duffus Village Hall provide a focal point for the community. Nearby are the remains of Duffus Castle, St. Peters' Kirk, and Spynie Palace.

Duffus has won numerous awards, including "Best Kept Small Village in the North of Scotland".

Name
The name of the village Duffus derives from the lands of Duffus in Moray, Scotland. What is now known as Duffus Parish encompasses the lands of the ancient Barony of Duffus and comprises . The Duffus name has undergone a variety of spelling changes through the years; in 1290, "Dufhus", and in 1512, "Duffous". The name is probably a compilation of two Gaelic words, dubh and uisg, meaning "darkwater" or "blackwater". At one time, the region was below sea-level and the Loch of Spynie and stagnant pools of water were a conspicuous feature of the area.

History
The current village, originally called New Duffus, is a grid plan village established as a planned settlement in 1811. This replaced an earlier medieval settlement which lay  to the east, of which only the ruined Old Parish Church remains.

A church was first founded on the site of Duffus Old Parish Church in the 9th century as a replacement for the church of St Aethan within Burghead Fort, which had been destroyed by the Vikings. The parish of Duffus included Burghead, and its dedication to Saint Peter may reflect an emulation by the Pictish Kingdom of Fortriu of the common Early Medieval pattern – also seen at Bamburgh and Canterbury – of giving this dedication to a Kingdom's primary centre of Royal power.

Duffus was the base of the regionally powerful de Moravia family during the High Middle Ages. The family was probably of Flemish origin. Freskin de Moravia came north from his lands in Lothian as part of an army of David I to put down another rebellion by the men of Moray. At his side, and soon to be a neighbor, was the ancestor of the Innes'.

The Dunbar baronets of Northfield have lived at the Duffus estate since the 17th century.

Culture and community
The annual Duffus Village Gala (held each summer) provides a host of activities for villagers and nearby settlements, starting with the crowning of the Rose Queen, Rose Prince & Rosebud. (Due to low entry rates the rose queen, Prince & bud no longer occur at the gala)

Notable residents 
 Alison Johnston, professional artist residing in Duffus
 Don Murray former professional footballer who was born and grew up in Duffus before playing for Cardiff City, Swansea City, Heart of Midlothian and Newport County.

See also
Duffus family website www.duffus.com
Gilbert de Moravia
Andreas de Moravia
Walter de Moravia
Fearchar, Earl of Ross
Nechtan IV of the Picts
Duffus Castle
Duffus - Sept of Sutherland

References

Bibliography
Barrow, G.W.S., The Kingdom of the Scots. Edinburgh University Press, Edinburgh, 2003. 

Villages in Moray